Knoth is a surname of German origin. Notable people with the surname include:

Cinthia Knoth (born 1962), Brazilian sailor
Fred Knoth (1907–1990), American special effects artist 
Petr Knoth (born 1983), Czech ice dancer

See also
Knothe

References

Surnames of German origin